Statistics of Swiss Super League in the 1946–47 season.

Overview
It was contested by 14 teams, and FC Biel-Bienne won the championship.

League standings

Results

Sources 
 Switzerland 1946–47 at RSSSF

Swiss Football League seasons
Swiss
Football